Keith Preston (1884–1927) was a Chicago-based literary critic, author and journalist.

Born in 1884, Preston had a strong academic background, holding a BA and PhD from the University of Chicago and an MA from Indiana University. After receiving his PhD in philosophy in 1914, he married Etta Shield, another classics scholar. He then taught classics and philosophy at Indiana University, Princeton University, and Northwestern University.

In 1922 he left academe to join the staff of the Chicago Daily News as a columnist and literary editor. He was literary editor there and wrote 'The Periscope' and 'Hit or Miss' columns.

Preston published four volumes of his humorous poetry during his lifetime and his wife published a collection of his poems after his death. He died at age 42 in 1927.

Further reading 
 Keith Preston Papers at Newberry Library

1884 births
1927 deaths
American literary critics
American male poets
American male journalists
American literary editors
20th-century American poets
20th-century American male writers
20th-century American non-fiction writers
University of Chicago alumni
Indiana University alumni
Princeton University faculty
Northwestern University faculty